Tirukkaanoor Semmeninathar Temple (திருக்கானூர் செம்மேனிநாதர் கோயில்) is a Hindu temple located at Thirukanur in Thanjavur district of Tamil Nadu, India. The historical name of the place is Tirukanurpatti. The place is also called as Manalmedu. The presiding deity is Shiva. He is called as Semmeninathar. His consort is known as Sivayoganayaki.

Significance 
It is one of the shrines of the 275 Paadal Petra Sthalams - Shiva Sthalams glorified in the early medieval Tevaram poems by Tamil Saivite Nayanars Tirugnanasambandar and Tirunavukkarasar. The temple is counted as one of the temples built on the northern banks of River Kaveri.

Literary Mention 
Tirugnanasambandar describes the feature of the deity as: 

Tirunavukkarasar describes the feature of the deity as:

References

External links 
 
 

Shiva temples in Thanjavur district
Padal Petra Stalam